Jill Smoller (born September 4, 1964) is an American sports agent and former professional tennis player.

Considered a pioneer for women sports agents, Smoller started her career in the late 1990s and counts Allyson Felix and Serena Williams as some of her clients.

As a tennis player she competed in college tennis for the Arizona Wildcats, before going on to tour professionally and featuring in the main draw of all four grand slam tournaments.

ITF finals

Doubles: 4 (3–1)

References

External links
 
 

1964 births
Living people
American female tennis players
American sports agents
Arizona Wildcats women's tennis players